The 1969–70 Yugoslav Ice Hockey League season was the 28th season of the Yugoslav Ice Hockey League, the top level of ice hockey in Yugoslavia. Six teams participated in the league, and Jesenice have won the championship.

Regular season

External links
 Season on hrhockey

Yugoslav
Yugoslav Ice Hockey League seasons
1969–70 in Yugoslav ice hockey